Roy Davis Jr. is an American electronic musician from Chicago, Illinois, specialising in house music.

Biography
Davis was born in California and grew up in Chicago, Illinois, United States, and became interested in house music at an early age by the likes of Lil' Louis, DJ Pierre, Farley Keith (Farley Jackmaster Funk) and Marshall Jefferson. Davis began his own production company named Phuture in the late 1980s and went on to become an A&R scout for record label Strictly Rhythm in NYC whilst also running his Chicago founded record label Undaground Therapy Muzik. A few years later, Davis and singer-songwriter Peven Everett wrote and produced the single "Gabriel" which was released on Large Records in 1996 and later licensed and released on XL Recordings in 1997. The track garnered international airplay, and was played in nightclubs around the world. It peaked at No. 22 on the UK Singles Chart in November 1997. The single sold over 200,000 copies and has appeared on numerous of compilation albums including Desert Island Mix from Gilles Peterson. In 2004, Davis' track "About Love" reached No. 70 in the UK, adding to the list of previous chart success with records such as "Who Dares to Believe in Me" under alias The Believers which was released on New York label Strictly Rhythm and "All I Do" released on Omar-S' artist-run label FXHE.

Roy Davis Jr. has also been known for his work for Thomas Bangalter's label Roulé which operated out of Paris in the early '90s and his production work for artists such as Eric Benet, Faith Evans, Mary J. Blige, Seal, Patti LaBelle, Christina Milian and Morcheeba.

In 2011, he produced a record with J. Noize and Kaye Fox called "Enjoy the Ride".

In April 2016, Davis announced that he had been diagnosed with multiple sclerosis, and was to cancel some planned shows but planned to return to performing live and producing music as his health would allow him.

Discography

Albums
The Secret Mission
Traxx from the Nile
Chicago Forever
Water for Thirsty Children
God Life Music
Destroy & Rebuild

Compilations
Midnight Passion / Looking for Excitement
Soul Electra

Singles
"Rock Shock"
"I Got the Music"
"Galactic Disco"
"Gabriel" (feat. Peven Everett) - UK #22
"About Love" - UK #70
All I Do

References

External links
Roy Davis Jr. at Ubiquity Records

Year of birth missing (living people)
Living people
American dance musicians
American electronic musicians
American house musicians
African-American DJs
Club DJs
House DJs
Remixers
Musicians from Chicago
DJs from Chicago
Ubiquity Records artists
XL Recordings artists
People with multiple sclerosis
21st-century African-American people
Electronic dance music DJs
Peacefrog Records artists